Lycaena is a genus of butterflies. The genus range is Holarctic, with the exception of four species found in New Zealand, two in South Africa, one in New Guinea and one in Java. It is commonly divided into several subgenera, such as Antipodolycaena. Many formerly independent genera are now subsumed within Lycaena; the genus Gaiedes may also belong here. Many of the subgenera, species groups and species listed here may be synonyms.

Species
Listed alphabetically within groups:

Subgenus Tharsalea Scudder, 1876:
Lycaena arota (Boisduval, 1852) – tailed copper

Subgenus Chalceria Scudder, 1876:
The thaeides species group:
Lycaena dione (Scudder, 1868)
Lycaena editha (Mead, 1878) – Edith's copper California, Montana, Wyoming, Nevada
Lycaena gorgon (Boisduval, 1852) – gorgon copper Nevada, California, Oregon
Lycaena xanthoides (Boisduval, 1852) – great gray copper California

The chalceria species group:
Lycaena ferrisi Johnson & Balogh, 1977 – Ferris' copper Arizona
Lycaena heteronea Boisduval, 1858 – blue copper 
Lycaena rubidus (Behr, 1866) – ruddy copper

Subgenus Epidemia Scudder, 1876:
The hyllolycaena species group:
Lycaena hyllus (Cramer, [1775]) – bronze copper

The epidemia species group:
Lycaena dorcas Kirby, 1837 – dorcas copper or cinquefoil copper
Lycaena dospassosi McDunnough, 1940
Lycaena epixanthe (Boisduval & Leconte, [1835]) – bog copper, cranberry-bog copper
Lycaena helloides (Boisduval, 1852) – purplish copper
Lycaena nivalis (Boisduval, 1869) – nivalis copper
Lycaena mariposa (Reakirt, 1866) – mariposa copper

Subgenus Hermelycaena Miller & Brown, 1979:
Lycaena hermes (Edwards, 1870) – Hermes copper

Subgenus Antipodolycaena Smart, 1975:
Lycaena boldenarum White, 1862 New Zealand
Lycaena feredayi (Bates, 1867) – glade copper
Lycaena rauparaha (Fereday, 1877) New Zealand
Lycaena salustius (Fabricius, 1793) – common copper

Unnamed subgenus:
The heodes species group:
Lycaena ottomanus (Lefèbvre, 1830) – Grecian copper 
Lycaena tityrus (Poda, 1761) – sooty copper
Lycaena virgaureae (Linnaeus, 1758) – scarce copper

The palaeochrysophanus species group:
Lycaena candens (Herrich-Schäffer, [1844]) South Europe, Caucasus, Transcaucasia
Lycaena hippothoe (Linnaeus, 1761) – purple-edged copper

Subgenus Lycaena Fabricius, 1807:
The helle species group:
Lycaena helle ([Schiffermüller], 1775) – violet copper
Lycaena irmae Bailey, 1932 South Tibet
Lycaena li (Oberthür, 1886) West China
Lycaena ouang (Oberthür, 1891) Yunnan
Lycaena pang (Oberthür, 1886) West China, Tibet
Lycaena svenhedini (Nordström, 1935) China
Lycaena tseng (Oberthür, 1886) North Burma to West China

The phlaeas species group:
Lycaena cupreus (Edwards, 1870) – lustrous copper
Lycaena kiyokoae Sakai, 1978 Afghanistan
Lycaena phlaeas (Linnaeus, 1761) – small copper, common copper, American copper
Lycaena sichuanica Bozano & Weidenhoffer, 2001

The thersamolycaena species group:
Lycaena aeolus Wyatt, 1961 West Pamirs, Afghanistan
Lycaena aeolides (Churkin, 1999) Gissar Range, Central Asia
Lycaena alciphron (Rottemburg, 1775) – purple-shot copper
Lycaena dispar (Haworth, 1802) – large copper
Lycaena splendens (Staudinger, 1881) Dzhungarsky Alatau, Tian-Shan (Central Asia)
Lycaena violaceus (Staudinger, 1892)

The thersamonia species group:
Lycaena aditya (Moore, [1875]) West Pamirs, Afghanistan, Pakistan, North India
Lycaena alaica (Grum-Grshimailo, 1888) Pamirs-Alai, Gissar Range, North east Afghanistan
Lycaena alpherakyi (Grum-Grshimailo, 1888) East Pamirs, Northwest China
Lycaena attila (Zhdanko, 1990) Zaalaisky Mountains (Trans-Ili Alatau) Central Asia
Lycaena asabinus (Herrich-Schäffer, [1851]) Turkey, Transcaucasia, Iran, Armenia
Lycaena hyrcana (Neuburger, 1903) North Iran to Central Asia
Lycaena kurdistanica (Riley, 1921) Armenia, Northeast Turkey, West Iran
Lycaena lampon Lederer, [1870] Kopet-Dagh, Southeast Turkey, Iran, Afghanistan
Lycaena ochimus (Herrich-Schäffer, [1851]) Transcaucasia, Armenia, Caucasus Minor, Turkey, Syria, Lebanon, Talysh Mountains (Iran - Azerbaijan)
Lycaena phoebus (Blachier, 1905) – Moroccan copper Morocco
Lycaena solskyi Erschoff, 1874 Pamirs to Alay Mountains, Gissar Range, Darvaz Range, Tian-Shan, Kashmir, Samarkand
Lycaena thersamon (Esper, 1784) – lesser fiery copper
Lycaena thetis Klug, 1834 – fiery copper or golden copper

The phoenicurusia species group:
Lycaena margelanica (Staudinger, 1881) South Tajikistan to Tien-Shan, Gissar Range, Darvaz, Alay, West Pamir, Babatag, Karatau, Teriklitau, Rangontau, Zailiisky Alatau, Lake Issyk-Kul mountains

The hyrcanana species group:
Lycaena caspius (Lederer, 1869) Kopet-Dagh, Gissar Range, North Iran, Afghanistan
Lycaena ophion Hemming, 1933 Kopet-Dagh, Gissar Range to Darvaz Tadzhikistan
Lycaena pamira (Nekrutenko, 1983)
Lycaena sartha (Staudinger, 1886) Gissar Range to Darvaz, Pamirs to Alay mountains, Northeast Afghanistan
Lycaena sultan (Lang, 1884) West Gissar Range (Zeravshansky, Ghissarsky, Baisuntau, Fanskie)

Unknown species group:
Lycaena bathinia Snellen, 1899 dubious Java
Lycaena clarki Dickson, 1971 – eastern sorrel copper
Lycaena evansii (de Nicéville, 1902) Kashmir, Chitral
Lycaena kasyapa (Moore, 1865) – green copper
Lycaena orus (Stoll, [1780]) – western sorrel copper 
Lycaena ottomanus (Lefèbvre, 1830) 
Lycaena pallida Miskin, 1891 New Guinea
Lycaena panava (Westwood, 1852)
Lycaena pavana (Kollar, [1844]) – white-bordered copper North India
Lycaena standfussi (Grum-Grshimailo, 1891) West China, Tibet
Lycaena susanus (Swinhoe, 1889) Baluchistan, Afghanistan, Pakistan
Lycaena tityrus Poda, 1761 – sooty copper
Lycaena virgaureae (Linnaeus, 1758) – scarce copper
Lycaena zariaspa (Moore, 1874) West Himalayas, Kashmir, Northwest India

References

External links
images representing Lycaena  at Consortium for the Barcode of Life

 
Lycaeninae
Lycaenidae genera
Taxa named by Johan Christian Fabricius